Aishite Imasu 1941 (from the Japanese 愛しています meaning I Love You; Filipino title Mahal Kita 1941, "Mahal Kita" also meaning I love You) is a drama, romance, and war movie released in the Philippines on December 25, 2004, and is a story of love, betrayal and honor in wartime set in the Japanese Occupation of the Philippines (1941–1945) during World War II. It stars Judy Ann Santos, Raymart Santiago, Jay Manalo and Dennis Trillo. It is directed by Joel Lamangan. It is an official entry to the 30th Metro Manila Film Festival.

Plot
The date is December 1941, and the simple folks of the quiet town of San Nicolas are unaware that war is nearing upon them. Inya (Judy Ann Santos) is a lovely young lady who had just married her childhood sweetheart Edilberto (Raymart Santiago) and they're excited about starting a new family. Ignacio "Igna" Basa (Dennis Trillo) is Inya's best friend, a transgender woman who has been in love with the handsome Edilberto for years. Ignacio falls for Ichiru Hamaguchi (Jay Manalo) a Japanese Army official who returns her affection, but becomes torn between fulfilling her duty to her country and her love for Ichiru.

The arrival of the Japanese throws the town into chaos, days after the Japanese air raid in Pearl Harbor in Hawaii on December 7 - which marked the start of the war. Meanwhile, on December 8, Japanese air bombings included Manila, Baguio, Davao, Iba and Clark fields to signal the Japanese invasion to the Philippines.

But Edilberto, Inya and Ignacio aren't the only ones the war will change forever. Traitorous Japanese interpreter and local collaborator Maura (Angelu de Leon), strong-willed Tiyang Mabel (Jacklyn Jose), tough guy Anton (TJ Trinidad), and pure-hearted Julia (Iya Villania) also get caught in the winds of the war, and find themselves doing things they never thought they'd do... all for the hope of living and dying another day.

Starting in December 1941, the guerrilla leader, Captain Ediberto Manalang (Raymart Santiago) was named Commander Berto, and was supported by other local guerrilla forces in the town of San Nicolas during the Fall of the Philippines. Meanwhile, battles between the Japanese and USAFFE troops ends in the Battle of Bataan in 1942 and the Bataan Death March begins on April 9 of that year. 76,000 surrendered Filipino and American troops became Prisoners of War under Japanese hands. The defeated troops were forced to march from Bataan to Tarlac. Anton joined the guerrilla movement. Ignacio became the movement's spy inside the Japanese forces, catching Maura's suspicion. Anytime Kapitan Berto attacks a Japanese patrol, the latter burns a village and executes suspected guerrilla members under direction from Maura. Inya is also suspected as a Japanese spy and tortured by the guerrillas.

She revealed Ignacio's secret to Hiroshi, who in turn told Ichiru. At first, he did not believe. Until he suffered a nightmare that he was holding his father's blood in front of the Americans. He tried to make love with Igna, but the latter refused. Ichiru revealed that he knew Ignacio is transgender and he never cared about it as long as he loves Igna.

A few years later, local guerrilla forces are led by Captain Inya Marasingan-Manalang, who replaced Commander Berto in 1943 after Edilberto died during a Japanese attack on their camp. The Japanese retaliated with brutality, hanging the mayor and others. Anton and Igna's transgender friend, Edna, were released at Igna's request. A guerrilla raid sealed Igna, Ichiru and Akihiro's fates. As Igna returned to the camp after she warned Inya of the raid, she was caught along with Ichiru by Maura and Hiroshi. Igna was beaten. Ichiru escaped along with Akihiro and Igna. They returned to Tiyang Mabel's house, where Akihiro and Ichiru committed seppuku. Igna again was arrested by Maura and Hiroshi. The former was tortured until unconscious. Kapitan Berto (Inya) raided the town hall, rescued the mayor and Igna and eliminated the Japanese garrison, at the cost of several resistance members, including Anton who was shot by Hiroshi, until the latter was also killed. As soon as Inya and Igna got outside, Maura and her backup arrived. As she shoots Inya, Igna uses her body as cover and took the fatal shot. Inya's men opened fire on Maura's vehicle, killing her and the Japanese inside. Igna's last words said she was a traitor, so she deserved a traitor's death.

Many decades and many coercions later, Inya told the whole truth about what happened during the time. As the mayor and the historian discusses future plans, including a memorial for the victims, she left them.

Cast
Judy Ann Santos as Inya Marasingan-Manalang
Raymart Santiago as Edilberto “Commander Berto” Manalang
Jay Manalo as Ichiru Hamaguchi
Dennis Trillo as Ignacio “Igna” Basa 
Marco Alcaraz as Akihiro Yorokobe
Angelu de Leon as Maura
Jacklyn Jose as Tiya Mabel
Yasmien Kurdi as Senyang
Anita Linda as Inya (old)
T.J. Trinidad as Anton
Iya Villania as Julia
Tony Mabesa as the Mayor
Domingo Landicho as Assistant of the Mayor
Jim Pebanco as Edna
Virginia Joshen
Neil Ryan Sese

Awards

Nominations

References

External links
 

Philippine LGBT-related films
2000s Tagalog-language films
Films about trans women
World War II films
Japanese occupation of the Philippines films
Philippine romantic drama films
Regal Entertainment films
2004 LGBT-related films
2004 films
2000s romance films
LGBT-related romantic drama films
Films directed by Joel Lamangan